A Light in the Black is the first novel by Chris Westwood, a British author of children's and young adult fiction. It was first published in the UK in 1989 by Viking Kestrel (part of the Penguin Group) and in the US in 1991 by HarperCollins Children's Books. Listed in Children's Books Of Year 1990 (. Andersen Press) and short-listed for the Guardian Children's Fiction Prize 1990.

Reviews 
Michael Baldwin, The Guardian: In Chris Westwood's A Light in the Black (Kestrel) a hypnotic stranger drops into town and the locals begin to drop out. Is Mr Stands a zombie, an alien, or just extremely odd? The plot may be as old as the Pied Piper of Hamelin, but the writer is extraordinarily — no, paranormally — compelling, and gives off a very sinister glitter.

References

1989 British novels
Novels by Chris Westwood
British horror novels
British children's novels
Penguin Books books
1989 children's books
1989 debut novels